Suzanne Raeth (22 March 1905 – 26 March 2001) was a French diver. She competed in the women's 3 metre springboard event at the 1924 Summer Olympics.

References

External links
 

1905 births
2001 deaths
French female divers
Olympic divers of France
Divers at the 1924 Summer Olympics
Sportspeople from Colmar
20th-century French women